The 2001 Adidas International was a tennis tournament played on outdoor hard courts at the NSW Tennis Centre in Sydney in Australia that was part of the International Series of the 2001 ATP Tour and of Tier II of the 2001 WTA Tour. The tournament ran from 7 through 14 January 2001.

ATP entrants

Seeds

 Rankings are as of January 1, 2001.

Other entrants
The following players received wildcards into the singles main draw:
  Wayne Arthurs
  Richard Fromberg
  Todd Woodbridge

The following player received entry as a special exempt into the main draw:
  Bohdan Ulihrach

The following players received entry from the qualifying draw:
  George Bastl
  Scott Draper
  Christophe Rochus
  Jeff Tarango

WTA entrants

Seeds

 Rankings are as of January 1, 2001.

Other entrants
The following players received wildcards into the singles main draw:
  Evie Dominikovic
  Alicia Molik
  Monica Seles

The following players received entry from the qualifying draw:
  Nadia Petrova
  Elena Bovina
  Brie Rippner
  Tina Pisnik

Finals

Men's singles

 Lleyton Hewitt defeated  Magnus Norman 6–4, 6–1
 It was Hewitt's 1st title of the year and the 9th of his career.

Women's singles

 Martina Hingis defeated  Lindsay Davenport 6–3, 4–6, 7–5
 It was Hingis' 1st title of the year and the 68th of her career.

Men's doubles

 Daniel Nestor /  Sandon Stolle defeated  Jonas Björkman /  Todd Woodbridge 2–6, 7–6(7–4), 7–6(7–5)
 It was Nestor's 2nd title of the year and the 18th of his career. It was Stolle's 1st title of the year and the 17th of his career.

Women's doubles

 Anna Kournikova /  Barbara Schett defeated  Lisa Raymond /  Rennae Stubbs 6–2, 7–5
 It was Kournikova's 1st title of the year and the 13th of her career. It was Schett's only title of the year and the 8th of her career.

External links
 Official website
 ATP tournament profile
 WTA tournament profile

 
Adidas International, 2001